Wangerooge Frisian is an extinct dialect of the East Frisian language, formerly spoken on the East Frisian island of Wangerooge. Wangerooge Frisian was a part of the Weser group of dialects which included the Wangerooge and the equally extinct Wursten dialect. The last speaker died in 1953.

See also 
 Frisia
 Frisian Islands
 Frisians

References 

East Frisian language
Extinct languages of Europe
Extinct Germanic languages
Wangerooge